The City of Echuca was a local government area in Victoria, Australia, about  north of Melbourne, the state capital.

History

The Borough of Echuca was incorporated on 3 January 1865, and became a city on 1 March 1965, just after its centenary celebrations.

On 18 November 1994, the City of Echuca was abolished, and along with the Town of Kyabram, the Shires of Deakin, Rochester and Waranga, and some neighbouring districts, was merged into the newly created Shire of Campaspe.

Wards
The City of Echuca was not divided into wards, and its nine councillors represented all electors in the city.

Population

* Estimate in the 1958 Victorian Year Book.

References

External links
 Victorian Places - Echuca

Echuca